Uranothauma williamsi is a butterfly in the family Lycaenidae. It is found in Tanzania (the Usambara Mountains and the Southern Highlands), Malawi and Zambia. The habitat consists of montane forests.

References

Butterflies described in 1961
Uranothauma